Lourde-Mary Rajeswari, better known as L. R. Eswari, is an Indian playback singer who has sung several songs in Tamil, Telugu, Malayalam, Kannada, Hindi, Tulu, and English.
She was awarded with the Kalaimamani, the highest civilian award for Arts and culture in Tamil Nadu, for her contributions to the film industry. Her only Hindi song to date is "Udati Si Chidiya", hailing from the film PISTOLWALI, which was the dubbed version of the Jyothilakshmi starrer-Pilla Piduga

Career
She sang under the direction of famous composers like M.S.Viswanathan, T.K.Ramamoorthy, K. V. Mahadevan, Veda, V.Kumar, Shankar-Ganesh, G. K. Venkatesh and Kunnakudi Vaidyanathan. Her unique voice was considered to be suited for peppy numbers in the movies, be it a dance tune, folk song or a devotional track.  Her song "Vaarayo Thozhi" from Paasa Malar was a popular choice for wedding music.

She has also recorded many devotional albums in praise of the Goddess Amman which were hugely popular among the Tamil community and were played in many temples. Her "Chellatha" and "Karpoora Nayagi" numbers has won her a lot of fame among devotees. She sang Christmas songs "Varuvai Varuvai" and " Deivam Thantha Divya Kumaaran" composed by Dr Anand Chellappa.
She has won the Kalaimamani Award and other states awards.
Her Hindi song "Udati Si Chidiya" from the film PISTOLWALI, music by Satyam shows her ability.
She sang romantic songs filmed on heroines as well as cabarets filmed on dance-artistes and also folk songs.

She made her everlasting impression in Telugu film industry with her husky and peppy numbers. Till date most of her songs are very popular among the Telugu audience. Her notable hits include "Maayadari Sinnodu" from Amma Maata (1971), "Masaka Masaka Cheekatilo" from Devudu Chesina Manushulu (1973),  "Bhale Bhale Magadivo" from Maro Charitra (1978), "Arey Emiti Lokam" from Anthuleni Katha (1976), "Malle Puvvulu Pillagaalulu" and "Theesko Coco Cola Esko Rammusoda" etc.

In Kannada language, Eswari has sung so many super hits songs. Her fun-filled songs like "Dooradinda Bandantha", "Rasika Rasika", "Joke Nanu Balliya", "O Geleya", "Yaavurayya E Mukka", "Sityako Sidukyako", "Sumabaleya Premada Siriye", "Bangara Nota", "Kanda Kanmaniye" made her name household in Karnataka.

P. Susheela and she sang many popular duets in their times – Unadhu Malar, Chiththira Poovizhi, Ninaithaal Sirippu, Thoodhu Sella etc.. She sang a popular duet "Gudilona Naa Swamy Koluvai Unnadu" with S. Janaki in a Telugu movie Idalokam, music by Chakravarthy, which remains a top hit till date. She rendered several duets with S. Janaki in Kannada movies as well.

She sang various duets with all the leading male singers also – Ghantasala, the Telugu doyen in his own music direction in Telugu movie Pandava Vana Vaasam, and in K. V. Mahadevan's music direction in Prema Nagar, T. M. Soundararajan, A. L. Raghavan, P. B. Sreenivas, S.P. Balasubramaniam, K. J. Yesudas, J. P. Chandrababu, C. S. Jayaraman, S. C. Krishnan, Thiruchi Loganathan, A. M. Rajah, Seerkazhi Govindarajan,Malaysia Vasudevan, & Jayachandran.

She also sang duets with female singers with most notably with P. Suseela, S. Janaki, Vani Jayaram, K. Jamuna Rani, M. S. Rajeswari and Soolamangalam Rajalakshmi.

She sung "Kanda kanmaniye ammana araginiye o raja" a Kannada song for movie 'Balanagamma' in early 1960s. Thousands and thousands of Kannada kids might have grown listening to this song from their mothers, grannies and others.L.R Eswari is perhaps one of the most versatile singers in the history of Indian cinema.

Re-entry
After a long break, she made her re-entry through a rocky peppy Tamil Song "Kalasala Kalasala " in the 2011 movie Osthe starring Silambarasan. Within a few days of this song release, it became a super hit and reached music box office top ratings. She sang the song "Naa Poondamallida" in the film Thadaiyara Thaakka the following year. She has also recently sang a Kannada song for the movie Victory, named "Yakka Nin Magalu Nanage" with Kailash Kher which also become super hit. In 2013, she sang a duet song called "Thagadu Thagadu" along with T. Rajendar in the movie Arya Surya. In 2014 she sang the song "Jaipuril Jaipuril" in the movie Athithi, music by Bharadwaj. In 2020, she had sung a song for nayanthara movie "Mookuthi Amman" named aadi kuthu.

Notable songs

Tamil songs

Telugu songs

Malayalam songs

 
She had sung in around 200 Malayalam Films

Kannada songs

Onscreen appearances
Thillalangadi (2010) as herself
Mookuthi Amman (2020) as herself

References

External links
 
 The Titillating Voices of Two Tamil Playback Singers in Movie minutes

1939 births
Living people
Indian women playback singers
Singers from Chennai
Kannada playback singers
Tamil playback singers
Malayalam playback singers
Telugu playback singers
Indian Roman Catholics
20th-century Indian singers
20th-century Indian women singers
Women musicians from Tamil Nadu